The Mouthpiece is a 1932 American pre-Code crime drama film starring Warren William and directed by James Flood and Elliott Nugent. It was produced and distributed by Warner Bros. The film is currently available on DVD in the Forbidden Hollywood series.

Plot
Vincent Day (Warren William) is a prosecutor who is on the fast track to success. When a man he zealously prosecuted all the way to the electric chair is found to have been innocent, he becomes distressed and quits his job. At the suggestion of a friendly bartender (Guy Kibbee), he decides to switch teams and become a defense attorney specializing in the representation of gangsters and other unsavory people. He will use any tactic to get his clients acquitted, up to and including drinking a slow-acting poison from a bottle of evidence to prove that the substance isn't lethal. The jury acquits the man not knowing that immediately after, Day rushes into a mob doctor's office for a pre-arranged stomach pump.

Celia Farraday (Sidney Fox) is a young secretary recently arrived in the city from a small town in Kentucky. When Day makes play for her, she spurns his advances, loyal to her fiancé, Johnny (William Janney). When the fiancé is framed for a crime committed by one of Day's clients, Day's affection for Celia not only prompts Day to defend Johnny by implicating his client in the crime, but to reconsider his life of getting criminals out of jail sentences. However, his associates send him a message that his departure will not be allowed. He lets them know that he has all of their secrets in a safe-deposit box, along with instructions for the bank to forward the contents to the District Attorney in the event of his unnatural death. They call his bluff and he is shot while leaving his office to attend Celia's wedding. On the way to the hospital, he tells his faithful secretary (Aline MacMahon) that the criminals were wrong to call his bluff and that the information will be on the way to the DA. The movie leaves it ambiguous whether Day, shot several times, will survive his wounds.

Cast

Other adaptations
The play Mouthpiece was adapted again in 1940 as The Man Who Talked Too Much starring George Brent. This adaptation has a different ending.

A third adaptation was released in 1955 as Illegal starring Edward G. Robinson.

References

External links
 
 
 
 

1932 films
American black-and-white films
1932 crime drama films
American crime drama films
American films based on plays
Warner Bros. films
1930s English-language films
Films directed by Elliott Nugent
Films directed by James Flood
1932 directorial debut films
1930s American films